Ashtamirohini is a 1975 Indian Malayalam film, directed by A. B. Raj and produced by Hassan Rasheed. The film stars Prem Nazir, KPAC Lalitha, Manavalan Joseph and Unnimary in the lead roles. The film has musical score by M. K. Arjunan. 
 The film was a remake of the Tamil film Petralthan Pillaiya.

Cast
 
Prem Nazir 
KPAC Lalitha 
Manavalan Joseph 
Unnimary 
Bahadoor 
K. P. Ummer 
Master Raghu 
Pushpa

Soundtrack
The music was composed by M. K. Arjunan.

References

External links
 

1975 films
1970s Malayalam-language films
Malayalam remakes of Tamil films